Bruno J. M. T. G. van Pottelsberghe de la Potterie (born 17 August 1968 in Uccle, Brussels, Belgium) is a Belgian economist. He is a Full-Time Professor at the Solvay Brussels School of Economics and Management (SBS-EM), Brussels, Belgium, of which he was the Dean from 2011 to 2017, and a Senior Fellow at the Bruegel think-tank in Brussels.

Education
He graduated in economics at the Université Libre de Bruxelles in 1995 and obtained a Master  in Econometrics there in 1994. In 1998, he obtained a PhD in economics there.

Career
From September 1996 to September 1997, he was a research fellow at the Université Libre de Bruxelles. From November 2005 to December 2007 he was chief economist at the European Patent Office. In October 1999, he became Associate Professor at the Solvay Brussels School of Economics and Management of the Université Libre de Bruxelles, holding the Solvay Chair of Innovation, where he is now a Full-Time Professor since October 2008. He was also an honorary professor at the School of Business, Management and Economics of the University of Sussex from Jan. 2010 to Dec. 2012.

Bibliography
 The Economics of the European Patent System: IP Policy for Innovation and Competition, Oxford University Press, 2007, with Dominique Guellec, 
 Lost property: The European patent system and why it doesn't work, Bruegel Blueprint Series, Volume IX, 29 June 2009,

See also 
 Dominique Guellec

References

External links
 Personal CV on the Solvay Brussels School of Economics and Management web site
 Personal page on the Solvay Brussels School of Economics and Management web site
 Interview with Bruno van Pottelsberghe, Staff Union of the European Patent Office (SUEPO), Interview conducted by Cynthia Matuszewski

1968 births
Belgian economists
Université libre de Bruxelles alumni
Living people
Bruegel (think tank) people
Academic staff of the Université libre de Bruxelles